This article lists the known kings of Lydia, both legendary and historical. Lydia was an ancient kingdom in western Anatolia during the first millennium BC. It may have originated as a country in the second millennium BC and was possibly called Maeonia at one time, given that Herodotus says the people were called Maeonians before they became known as Lydians. Herodotus and other sources refer to three dynasties: the Maeoniae, Heracleidae (Heraclids) and Mermnadae. The first two are legendary, though later members of the Heraclid dynasty are at least semi-legendary. The Mermnadae are historical.

Maeoniae
The earliest Maeonian or Lydian king mentioned by Herodotus is Manes who was the father of Atys. There was a severe famine during the reign of Atys and half of the citizens, led by Atys' son Tyrrhenus, emigrated to Italy as the Tyrrhenians. Other sources, such as Strabo, name Tmolus and his son Tantalus as kings of the region about the same time, supposedly ruling from the land about Mount Sipylus, but it is asserted that these two were the same people as Manes and Atys, especially as Omphale is a member of both families. Dionysius of Halicarnassus instead puts Cotys as the son of Manes, and as the father of Atys.

The known legendary kings are:

 Manes
 Atys, son of Manes
 Lydus, son of Atys
 Iardanus

Herodotus says that Lydus gave his name to the country and its people. The line of Lydus continued through an unstated number of generations until they, as Herodotus says, "turned over the management of affairs to the Heraclids". He adds that the Heraclids in Lydia were the descendants of Heracles and a slave-girl belonging to Iardanus; the line was from Heracles through Alcaeus, Belus and Ninus to Agron who was the first Heraclid king of Lydia.

Heraclidae
Herodotus says the Heraclids ruled Lydia for 505 years through 22 generations with son succeeding father all down the line from Agron to Candaules. While Candaules was the last of the Heraclids to reign at Sardis, Herodotus says Agron was the first and thereby implies that Sardis was already the capital of Lydia in Maeonian times. Candaules died c.687 BC and so the 505-year span stated by Herodotus suggests c.1192 BC for Agron's accession. That is about the time the Hurri-Hittite empire collapsed and thus the land of seha river could become independent from its Hittite overlords and gives more credibility to the tradition heard by Herodotus.

The known Heraclid kings are:

 Agron (fl. c.1192 BC; legendary great-great-grandson of Heracles and a Lydian slave-girl via Alcaeus, Belus and Ninus)
 19 legendary kings, names unknown, all succeeding father to son
 Meles, aka Myrsus (8th century BC; semi-legendary father of Candaules)
 Candaules, aka Myrsilus (died c.687 BC; probably historical; son of Meles; murdered by Gyges)

Mermnadae
Although this dynasty is historical, the dates for it have never been determined with certainty. The traditional dates are derived from Herodotus, who gives some reign-lengths, but these have been questioned by modern scholars on the basis of synchronisms with Assyrian history. The name of the dynasty (Gk. Μερμνάδες) may be attested in Lydian transmission as -𐤪𐤷𐤦𐤪𐤫𐤠 mλimna-. Etymologically, it possibly contains the Carian word mno- 'son' or 'descendant', which would then represent an argument for the Carian origin of the Mermnad clan.

There were five kings, all historical figures, in the Mermnad line:  
 Gyges, aka Guges (c.680–c.644 BCE; husband of Candaules' widow)
 Ardys, aka Ardysus (c.644–c.637 BC; son of Gyges)
 Sadyattes (c.637–c.635 BCE; son of Ardys)
 Alyattes (c.635–585 BCE; son of Sadyattes)
 Croesus, aka Kroisos (c.585–546 BC; son of Alyattes)

Gyges died in battle c.644 BCE, fighting against the Cimmerians, and was succeeded by Ardys. The most successful king was Alyattes, under whom Lydia reached its peak of power and prosperity. Croesus was defeated by Cyrus the Great at the battles of Pteria and Thymbra. Cyrus annexed Lydia after the Siege of Sardis which ended in early 546 BC, but the fate of Croesus himself is uncertain.

Genealogy

References

Sources
 
 

 
Lydia